Frenzied Finance is a 1916 American silent comedy film featuring Oliver Hardy.

Cast
 Bobby Burns as Pokes
 Walter Stull as Jabbs
 Oliver Hardy (as Babe Hardy)
 Frank Hanson
 Ethel Marie Burton
 Mildred Burstein

See also
 List of American films of 1916
 Oliver Hardy filmography

External links

1916 films
1916 short films
American silent short films
American black-and-white films
1916 comedy films
Silent American comedy films
American comedy short films
1910s American films